William (Bill) Wynn Jones (10 November 1900, Swansea, Wales – 29 May 1950, Dar es Salaam, Tanzania) was a Welsh Anglican Bishop of Central Tanganyika from 1946 until his death by a car accident in 1950.

Life
William (Bill) Wynn Jones was the youngest son of the industrial engineer Matthew Tertius Jones, who was a founder of the trans-European steamship agency M. Jones and Brothers (est. 1856). Wynn Jones's cousins included the trans-European steamship agent Ernest William Jones; and the prominent British gynaecologist Arthur Webb-Jones; and the Vice-Consul for Chile and Secretary to the Chamber of Commerce Edwin Price Jones. Wynn Jones's nephew was the choral conductor and educator James William Webb-Jones.

Wynn Jones in 1933 married Ruth Minton Taylor, who was a granddaughter of the Premier of Tasmania Henry Dobson and a staff member of Mvumi Girls School. Wynn Jones and Ruth Minton Taylor's children included the Tanzanian-born conservative Naomi Wilson OAM (b. 1940), who was a National Party of Australia member of the Legislative Assembly of Queensland from 1995 to 1998.

Career
Wynn Jones was educated at Queen's College, Taunton, until he accepted the invitation of the Reverend George Chambers to emigrate to Australia, where he in Sydney matriculated at Trinity Grammar School (New South Wales), subsequent to which he received from University of Sydney a BA in 1922 and an MA in 1927. Wynn Jones in 1921 he joined the staff of Trinity Grammar School as a house and sports master. He was ordained deacon in 1925, and priest 1926, and was appointed curate at Holy Trinity, Dulwich Hill, where he was involved in the Boy Scout movement, and in 1927 joined CMS for missionary service in Central Tanganyika under Bishop Chambers, during which he became principal of Kongwa Theological College. Wynn Jones was in 1941 appointed as the first headmaster of Arusha European School, then subsequently in 1941 as Chancellor of the Diocese, then in 1947 as Assistant Bishop of Central Tanganyika, then in 1948 as Second Bishop of Central Tanganyika. He attended in 1948 attended the Lambeth Conference. He in May 1949 received an Honorary Lambeth Doctorate of Divinity.

Death
Wynn Jones died by a car accident in 1950, and was buried in Dar es Salaam, Tanzania.

References

People from Swansea
1900 births
1950 deaths
Burials in Tanzania